The 1954 Irish Greyhound Derby took place during July and August with the final being held at Shelbourne Park in Dublin on 7 August 1954.

The winner Spanish Battleship won £500 and was trained by Tom Lynch and owned by Tim 'Chubb' O'Connor.

Final result 
At Shelbourne, 7 August (over 525 yards):

Distances 
3, 4  (lengths)

Competition Report
The defending champion Spanish Battleship headed for Shelbourne Park following a rest because he had injured a leg during the 1954 Callanan Cup final. After the first night's racing doubts surfaced that he could successfully defend his title because he had been injured and a greyhound called Leafy Ash who had finished second in the 1954 English Greyhound Derby final recorded 29.93, in a first round win. However The following evening Spanish Battleship then proceeded to break the track record with a remarkable 29.50 run, which led to the Irish press stating that it was a foregone conclusion that the dog would win again. The second round win was impressive but nine spots slower than his first round win; the next best being Ollys Quare Rebel in 29.74.

In the semi-finals Spanish Battleship equalled his own track record winning eight lengths ahead of Dignity. Aughacommon Rex beat Moyola Flash and Palm's Son defeated Olly's Quare Rebel in the remaining semi-finals.

Spanish Battleship wrote his name into the history books as the first ever two time Irish Derby winner despite missing his break from the traps in the final. He showed enough of his renowned early pace to quickly overtake early leader Dignity and go on to win by three lengths in 29.64.

See also
 1954 UK & Ireland Greyhound Racing Year

References

Greyhound Derby
Irish Greyhound Derby